Phtheochroa durbonana is a species of moth of the family Tortricidae. It is found in the western Alps and Iran.

The wingspan is about 20 mm. Adults have been recorded on wing in July.

References

Moths described in 1937
Phtheochroa